The Dark throat worm eel (Scolecenchelys fuscogularis) is an eel in the family Ophichthidae (worm/snake eels). It was described by Yusuke Hibino, Yoshiaki Kai, and Seishi Kimura in 2013. It is a marine, temperate water-dwelling eel which is known from Japan, in the northwestern Pacific Ocean. It dwells at a depth range of 90–147 metres. Males can reach a maximum total length of 26.5 centimetres.

The species epithet "fuscogularis" means "dark throat" in Latin, and refers to the dark branchial basket of the eel.

References

Fish described in 2013
Scolecenchelys